Gino Pernice (6 May 1927 – 25 April 1997) was an Italian stage, television and film actor.

Life and career 
Born in Milan, Pernice trained at the Accademia dei Filodrammatici graduating in 1952, and made his professional debut with the stage company of Fantasio Piccoli at the Teatro Stabile of Bolzano. His breakthrough role was Tobia in a staging of Twelfth Night held by the De Lullo-Falk-Guarnieri-Valli's "Compagnia dei Giovani". Mainly active on stage, he also had an intense career as a character actor in films and TV-series.

Selected filmography 

 Carmela è una bambola (1958) - Douglas
 The Attic (1963)
 Torpedo Bay (1963)
 White Voices (1964) - The Singer with red suit
 Attack and Retreat (1964) - Collidi
 Minnesota Clay (1964) - Scratchy
 The Man Who Laughs (1966)
 Adultery Italian Style (1966) - Roberto
 Django (1966) - Brother Jonathan
 Texas, Adios (1966) - Bank Employee
 The Hellbenders (1967) - Jeff
 The Head of the Family (1967)
 Rita of the West (1968) - Tribunal President Joseph
 The Specialist (1969) - Cabot - Gambler
 Metello (1970) - Idina's Husband (uncredited)
 Compañeros (1970) - Tourneur
 Io non spezzo... rompo (1971) - Policeman from Liguria
 The Working Class Goes to Heaven (1971) - Sindacalista
 Er Più – storia d'amore e di coltello (1971) - Pietro Di Lorenzo
 Jus primae noctis (1972) - Marculfo
 Daniele e Maria (1973)
 Hospitals: The White Mafia (1973) 
 The Gamecock (1974) - The Travelling Salesman of Encyclopedias
 Professore venga accompagnato dai suoi genitori (1974) - Police superintendent
 La sbandata (1974) - Carluzzo - card player
 The Sex Machine (1975) - Assistant
 Di che segno sei? (1975) - Il dottore
 Soldier of Fortune (1976) - Fanfulla da Lodi
 How to Lose a Wife and Find a Lover (1978) - Arturo - Eleonora's husband
 Il corpo della ragassa (1979) - Alberto Marengo
 Culo e camicia (1981) - Carletto Benedetti
 Porca vacca (1982)
 Spaghetti House (1982) - Valentino
 Secret Scandal (1990) - Paolo Morelli (final film role)

References

External links 
 

1927 births 
1997 deaths 
20th-century Italian male actors
Italian male film actors 
Italian male television actors 
Male actors from Milan